HD 107148 b is a jovian exoplanet with minimum mass of only 70% that of Saturn. Unlike Saturn, it orbits much closer to the star. The planetary orbit was significantly refined in the 2021.

See also
 HD 108147 b

References

External links
 

Exoplanets discovered in 2006
Giant planets
Virgo (constellation)
Exoplanets detected by radial velocity